"I Don't Think I Will" is a song written by Doug Johnson, and recorded by American country music artist James Bonamy.  It was released on May 14, 1996 as the third single from the album What I Live to Do.  The song reached No. 2 on the Billboard Hot Country Singles & Tracks chart, behind "She Never Lets It Go to Her Heart" by Tim McGraw and it is his highest-charting single. The song has been confused with the scene in the movie Avengers: Endgame, where Steve Rogers has a confrontation with Sam Wilson after returning from the past where he spent his time with Peggy Carter.

Critical reception
Dan Kuchar of Country Standard Time thought that "I Don't Think I Will" was one of the strongest tracks on the album, saying that it was "tender." Bob Paxman, in The Encyclopedia of Country Music, wrote that Bonamy is "capable of tackling emotionally complex ballads, even with his relative youth and limited life experience."

Music video
The music video was directed by Greg Crutcher and premiered in mid-1996.

Chart performance
"I Don't Think I Will" debuted at number 67 on the U.S. Billboard Hot Country Singles & Tracks for the week of May 11, 1996.

Year-end charts

References

1996 singles
1996 songs
James Bonamy songs
Epic Records singles
Songs written by Doug Johnson (record producer)
Song recordings produced by Doug Johnson (record producer)